Ahad Raza Mir (born 29 September 1993) is a Pakistani-Canadian actor. He has established a career in Pakistan and is the recipient of several awards including the Lux Style Awards.

Mir earned recognition with the television series Sammi (2017), and in the romantic drama Yaqeen Ka Safar which proved to be a breakthrough for him, earning him critical acclaim and a Lux Style Award for Best Actor.

Personal life

On 6 June 2019, Mir got engaged to actress Sajal Aly, and married her in a private intimate ceremony on 14 March 2020 in Abu Dhabi.

In March 2022, there were speculations that the couple had parted ways after Sajal Aly reverted her name on Instagram.

Life and career

Early life, career beginnings and stage roles (1993–2016) 
Ahad Raza Mir was born on 29 September 1993 in Karachi, Sindh, Pakistan. He is the son of Asif Raza Mir, a veteran actor and producer of the Pakistani film and television industry. Mir's paternal grandfather, Raza Mir, was a filmmaker who also served as cinematographer for the first ever Pakistani film, Teri Yaad (1948). His mother Samra Raza Mir is a musician who was part of Pakistan's first female band, Symphony, formed in 1993. He has a younger brother, Adnan Raza Mir. Singer-turned-actor Haroon Shahid is his cousin.

Mir attended a Performing Arts High School, and graduated from the University of Calgary with a Bachelor of Fine Arts degree.

Mir started his career in 2010 at age 17, playing a brief role as the son of Sania Saeed and Faisal Rehman in the Hum TV's romantic drama Khamosiyan. Mir started his career on stage, performing, directing and writing in several musicals and plays across Canada. Mir wanted to move to Toronto, but instead decided to go back to Pakistan to work in films and television.

Yaqeen Ka Safar and rise to prominence (2017–present)

In 2017, Mir started auditioning for Hum TV's production house MD Productions, and was cast as a leading role in Yaqeen Ka Safar where he played Dr. Asfand Yaar, a grief-stricken brother alongside Sajal Aly and Hira Mani. He then had a supporting role in the social drama Sammi opposite Mawra Hocane. His performance earned him Lux Style Award for Best Actor, and won three Hum Awards including the Hum Award for Best Actor.

Coming from an influential filmmaking family, Ahad was accused of nepotism. Responding to such claims Mir stated that he wanted “people to take [him],as an actor, very seriously and that he is “here to give Pakistan some good cinema and TV”.

In 2018 Mir made his Coke Studio debut as a featured artist in its eleventh-season, where he performed the song "Ko Ko Korina" with Momina Mustehsan. Their rendition of the classic song was widely criticized. Within a few days of the video being released on YouTube, it became the most-disliked video in the music show's history.
 
That same year, Mir made his film debut with Haseeb Hassan's military-drama Parwaaz Hay Junoon, co-starring Hamza Ali Abbasi and Hania Amir, which was released on Eid al-Adha. Mir replaced Osman Khalid Butt in a role of Flight Lieutenant Saad, who opted out due to his other commitments.
 
In 2018 Mir reunited with Sajal Aly and Mawra Hocane in Hum TV's Mohammed Ehteshamuddin-directed period drama Aangan where he played a poet, Jameel.

In 2019, The Shakespeare Company,in a joint production with Vertigo Theatre in Canada, signed Mir to play Hamlet in their production becoming one of the first South Asian actor to play the role professionally in Canada. His performance won him the Betty Mitchell Award for Outstanding Performance by an Actor in a Drama.

Mir became an executive producer for the upcoming movie Kalasha, revolving around the culture of the Kalash people of the Chitral Valley.

Filmography

Film

Television

Web series

Music video

Theatre

Awards and nominations

References

External links 
 

1993 births
People from Karachi
Musicians from Karachi
Male actors from Karachi
Pakistani people of Kashmiri descent
Living people
Pakistani male television actors
Pakistani male film actors
Pakistani dramatists and playwrights
Pakistani male singers
Lux Style Award winners
Pakistani stage actors
University of Calgary alumni
Hum Award winners
Pakistani emigrants to Canada
Male actors in Urdu cinema
Naturalized citizens of Canada
Canadian people of Kashmiri descent